The 2001–02 Cymru Alliance was the twelfth season of the Cymru Alliance after its establishment in 1990. The league was won by Welshpool Town.

League table

External links
Cymru Alliance

Cymru Alliance seasons
2
Wales